Elena Chebanu (born 4 January 1981) is a Ukrainian-born Azerbaijani sprinter who specializes in the 100 and 200 metres. She was born in Ukraine and initially took part in regular sprint events, but since 2015 competes for Azerbaijan in the visually impaired category T12. She won the silver medal in the 100 m – T12 event at the 2016 Rio Paralympics.

In the 200 metres she finished seventh at the 2006 European Championships and competed without reaching the final at the 2007 World Championships. In the 100 metres she won the silver medal at the 2007 Summer Universiade. Here she also won a bronze medal in the 4 × 100 m relay.

She also competed in relay at the 2009 World Championships without reaching the final. At the 2007 World Championships the Ukrainian team failed to finish the race. Her personal best times are 7.46 seconds in the 60 metres (indoor), achieved in January 2007 in Zaporizhzhya; 11.42 seconds in the 100 metres, achieved in June 2006 in Kyiv; and 22.97 seconds in the 200 metres, achieved in June 2006 in Málaga.

References

External links 

 

1981 births
Living people
Sportspeople from Kharkiv
Ukrainian female sprinters
Azerbaijani female sprinters
Ukrainian emigrants to Azerbaijan
Naturalized citizens of Azerbaijan
Athletes (track and field) at the 2016 Summer Paralympics
Paralympic silver medalists for Azerbaijan
Medalists at the 2016 Summer Paralympics
Universiade medalists in athletics (track and field)
Universiade silver medalists for Ukraine
Universiade bronze medalists for Ukraine
European Games competitors for Azerbaijan
Athletes (track and field) at the 2015 European Games
Paralympic medalists in athletics (track and field)
Paralympic athletes of Azerbaijan
Medalists at the 2007 Summer Universiade